Roxithromycin is a semi-synthetic macrolide antibiotic. It is used to treat respiratory tract, urinary and soft tissue infections. Roxithromycin is derived from erythromycin, containing the same 14-membered lactone ring. However, an N-oxime side chain is attached to the lactone ring.  It is also currently undergoing clinical trials for the treatment of male-pattern hair loss.

It was patented in 1980 and approved for medical use in 1987. Roxithromycin is available under several brandnames. Roxithromycin is not available in the United States. Roxithromycin is available in Australia, France, Germany, Israel, South Korea and New Zealand. Roxithromycin has also been tested to possess antimalarial activity.

Side effects 
Most common side effects are gastrointestinal; diarrhoea, nausea, abdominal pain and vomiting.  Less common side effects include central or peripheral nervous system events such as headaches, dizziness, vertigo, and also the rarely seen rashes, abnormal liver function values and alteration in senses of smell and taste.

Drug interactions 

Roxithromycin has fewer interactions than erythromycin as it has a lower affinity for cytochrome P450.

Roxithromycin does not interact with hormonal contraceptives, prednisolone, carbamazepine, ranitidine or antacids.

When roxithromycin is administered with theophylline, some studies have shown an increase in the plasma concentration of theophylline. A change in dosage is usually not required but patients with high levels of theophylline at the start of the treatment should have their plasma levels monitored.

Roxithromycin appears to interact with warfarin. This is shown by an increase in prothrombin time and/or international normalised ratio (INR) in patients taking roxithromycin and warfarin concurrently. As a consequence, severe bleeding episodes have occurred.

Available forms 
Roxithromycin is commonly available as tablets or oral suspension.

Mechanism of action 
Roxithromycin prevents bacteria from growing, by interfering with their protein synthesis. Roxithromycin binds to the subunit 50S of the bacterial ribosome, and thus inhibits the synthesis of peptides. Roxithromycin has similar antimicrobial spectrum as erythromycin, but is more effective against certain gram-negative bacteria, particularly Legionella pneumophila.

Pharmacokinetics 
When taken before a meal, roxithromycin is very rapidly absorbed, and diffuses into most tissues and phagocytes. Due to the high concentration in phagocytes, roxithromycin is actively transported to the site of infection. During active phagocytosis, large concentrations of roxithromycin are released.

Metabolism 
Only a small portion of roxithromycin is metabolised. Most of roxithromycin is secreted unchanged into the bile and some in expired air. Under 10% is excreted into the urine. Roxithromycin's half-life is 12 hours.

History 
French pharmaceutical company Roussel Uclaf first marketed roxithromycin in 1987.

References

External links 
 

Macrolide antibiotics